Gyro may refer to:

Science and technology 
 GYRO, a computer program for tokamak plasma simulation
 Gyro Motor Company, an American aircraft engine manufacturer
 Gyrodactylus salaris, a parasite in salmon
 Gyroscope, an orientation-stabilizing device
 Autogyro, a type of rotary-wing aircraft
 Honda Gyro, a family of tilting three wheel vehicles
 The casually used brand name of a detangler mechanism, part of a stunt-adapted BMX bicycle

Fictional characters 
 Gyro Gearloose, a comic book character from Disney's Duck universe
 Gyro Zeppeli, one of the main characters of the manga Steel Ball Run

Other uses 
 Gyro (magazine), student magazine of Otago Polytechnic, New Zealand
 Gyro International, a social fraternal organization
 Gyroball, a Japanese baseball pitch
 Gyro, or gyros, a greek pita wrap or the rotisserie cooked meat it contains
 Johnny Gyro, American martial arts instructor and competitive karate fighter

See also
 
 Giro (disambiguation)